The transnational capitalist class (TCC), also known as the transnational capitalist network (TCN), in neo-Gramscian and Marxian-influenced analyses of international political economy and globalization, is the global social stratum that controls supranational instruments of the global economy such as transnational corporations and heavily influences political organs such as the World Trade Organization. 

Up until 1960s capitalist class was studied mostly within the national context. Study from 1974 titled Global Reach: The Power of the Multinational Corporation by Ronald E. Muller and Richard Barnet started the discussion about multinational corporations and to what authors referred as “international corporate elite.”

According to Professor William I. Robinson it is "that segment of the world bourgeoisie that represents transnational capital". It is characteristically cosmopolitan and often unconstrained by national boundaries. The transnational capitalist class is expressed as a global ruling class and essential players of global capitalism by William I. Robinson and Jerry Harris. 

Different factions within this class exist. Harris, for example, identifies statist-factions of the TCC in Russia, China, and the Persian Gulf. Various studies have examined the role of the TCC in Asia, Africa, the Caribbean, Europe, Latin America, the Middle East, North America, and Oceania.

Professor Leslie Sklair argues that the transnational capitalist class is made up of four fractions which he identifies as corporate, state, technical and consumerist. The four fractions stated by Professor Leslie Sklair, bring together transnational corporations (TNC), globalizing bureaucrats, globalizing professionals and merchants as well as the media as members of the TCC. Also according to Sklair's book Sociology of the Global System, the World Economic Forum (WEF) shows the existence of the TCC as the corporate fraction and the state fraction gather in Davos, Switzerland. The theory of the Transnational Capitalist Class has two main principles:
 The transnational capitalist class collaborate to benefit their own interests (powerful lobbyists and super PACs);
 Nation states have less control over transnational capitalist corporations aiding in globalization.

"Davos Man" is a neologism referring to the global elite of wealthy (predominantly) men, whose members view themselves as completely "international" and who despise the people of their own country, being loyal only to global capital itself. According to political scientist Samuel P. Huntington, who is credited with inventing the phrase "Davos Man", they are people who "have little need for national loyalty, view national boundaries as obstacles that thankfully are vanishing, and see national governments as residues from the past whose only useful function is to facilitate the élite's global operations". In his 2004 article "Dead Souls: The Denationalization of the American Elite", Huntington argues that this international perspective is a minority elitist position not shared by the nationalist majority of the people.

Ian Richardson sees Bilderberg group as the transnational power elite, "an integral, and to some extent critical, part of the existing system of global governance", that is "not acting in the interests of the whole".

References

Further reading 
 Carroll, William K. (2010) The Making of a Transnational Capitalist Class (Zed Books, U.S.). 
 Harris, Jerry (2008) The Dialectics of Globalization: Economic and Political Conflict in a Transnational World (Cambridge Scholars Publishing, UK). 
 Harris, Jerry (2016) Global Capitalism and the Crisis of Democracy (Clarity Press, U.S.). 
 Liodakis, George (Routledge, UK). 
 Robinson, William I. (2004) A Theory of Global Capitalism: Production, Class, and State in a Transnational World  (Johns Hopkins University Press, U.S.). 
 Robinson, William I. (2014) Global Capitalism and the Crisis of Humanity (Cambridge University Press, U.S.) 
 Robinson, William I. (2019) Into the Tempest: Essays on the New Global Capitalism (Haymarket Books, U.S.) 
 Sklair, Leslie (2001) The Transnational Capitalist Class (Wiley-Blackwell Publishing, Oxford, UK). 
 Sprague, Jeb (2019) Globalizing the Caribbean: Political Economy, Social Change, and the Transnational Capitalist Class (Temple University Press, U.S.). 
 Van Der Pijl, Kees (1998) Transnational Classes and International Relations (Routledge, London and New York). 

Marxist theory
Social classes
Transnationalism